Margaret Lee Scoville (3 May 1944 - 1978) was an American composer of chamber, electronic and piano music.

Scoville was born in Pasadena, California. She studied music at the State University of New York, Buffalo, where she participated in the university’s Evenings for New Music as a Creative Associate Graduate Fellow and composer. Her teachers included Morton Feldman, Ramon Fuller, Lejaren Hiller, and William Kothe.

Scoville’s piano pieces were recorded by George Skipworth on LP EDUCO 3097.

Chamber 

Ephemerae (violin, two viola and cello)

Fading, Still Fading (flute, viola and piano) 

Lament on the Death of Proposition 15 (two flutes and oboe)

Time Out of Mind (two percussion)

Electronic 

Electric Sunday (magnetic tape)

Number 9 (tape)

Thirteen Ways of Looking at a Blackbird (chamber ensemble and tape)

Piano 

Ostinato, Fantasy and Fugue

Pentacycle

Vocal 

“Four Fragments from Empedocles” (soprano, flute and piano)

References 

American women composers
Electronic music
1944 births
1978 deaths
People from Pasadena, California